Edward Croft may refer to:

Eddie Croft (Edward Lee Croft), boxer
Edward Croft (MP) (died 1601), English politician